The Price of Freedom is a role-playing game published by West End Games in 1986.

Description
The Price of Freedom is a modern military system in which characters are part of an American resistance battling Soviet invaders. The modern-weapons combat system employs maps and counters. The game includes a "Player Book" (32 pages), "Gamemaster Book" (64 pages),miniscenarios, and maps.

Publication history
The Price of Freedom was designed by Greg Costikyan, and was published by West End Games in 1986 as a boxed set including a 64-page book, a 32-page book, four 4-page pamphlets, two color maps, counters, a counter tray, and dice.

Reception
Ashley Shepherd reviewed The Price of Freedom for White Dwarf #86, and stated that "I have the feeling that Price is intended to be taken as a tongue-in-cheek game. At least, I hope it is..."

Two French articles criticized the way the Soviets are depicted, and especially the fact that only American resistants have Hero Points, and only Soviets and collaborationists endure panic.

According to Petterson, "[The Price of Freedom is] a conservative game designed by a non-conservative designer wishing to sell games to conservatives. [... it] is clearly and explicitly meant to be played by conservative U.S. players living in 1986." Contrarily, James Maliszewski consider that "This isn't exactly a game that takes itself too seriously. […] like Paranoia, The Price of Freedom is actually a well-designed little game."

Reviews
White Wolf #7 (1987)
Arcane #13 (December 1996)
 Casus Belli #37 (April 1987)

References

Greg Costikyan games
Military role-playing games
Role-playing games introduced in 1986
West End Games games